WYBN-LD, virtual channel 14 (UHF digital channel 26), is a low-powered Buzzr-affiliated television station licensed to Cobleskill, New York, United States. The station is owned by the Cable Ad Net New York, Inc. WYBN-LD's transmitter is located on the Helderberg TV antenna farm site.

WVBG-LD (channel 25) in Greenwich, New York operates as a translator of WYBN-LD.

Subchannels
The station's digital signal is multiplexed:

References

External links
Official website

YBN-LD
Buzzr affiliates
This TV affiliates
Retro TV affiliates
Classic Reruns TV affiliates
NewsNet affiliates
Television channels and stations established in 2007
2007 establishments in New York (state)
Low-power television stations in the United States